Hellicar is a surname. Notable people with the surname include:

 Ames Hellicar (1847–1907), New Zealand cricketer
 Evelyn Hellicar (1862–1929), English architect